Holy Angels Church is the oldest extant church building in the Roman Catholic Diocese of Toledo and Erie County, Ohio.  The stone Gothic Revival style church is located on West Jefferson Street at Tiffin Avenue and Clinton Street in Sandusky, Ohio.

It was built in 1841 and added to the National Register of Historic Places in 1982.

References

External links

Official website

Churches on the National Register of Historic Places in Ohio
Gothic Revival church buildings in Ohio
Roman Catholic churches completed in 1841
Churches in Erie County, Ohio
National Register of Historic Places in Erie County, Ohio
Roman Catholic churches in Sandusky, Ohio
19th-century Roman Catholic church buildings in the United States